The Watkins 27P, also known as the W27P, is an American sailboat that was designed by naval architect Walter Scott and first built in 1981.

The Watkins 27P design was developed from the commercially successful Watkins 27, by adding a pilothouse and making changes to the mast height and sail area.

Production
The design was built by Watkins Yachts in Clearwater, Florida, United States. A total of seven examples were completed, with all constructed in  1981.

Development
The boat was initiated as "one-off" custom design for a customer, using the Watkins 27 hull and deck as a basis. Once completed, the company decided to put the design into production to compete with Morgan Yachts and Pearson Yachts, which were also producing pilothouse yachts at that time.

The prototype was used to create a mould for the pilothouse, the mast was then shortened, the boom raised to clear the pilothouse and the sailplan was adjusted accordingly.

Design
The Watkins 27P is a recreational keelboat, built predominantly of polyester resin-based fiberglass, with teak wood trim. Plywood coring is used in the structures of the cabin roof, the deck, seats and cockpit sole for  additional stiffness. It has a masthead sloop rig with 6061-T6 aluminum spars, a raked stem, a vertical transom, a skeg-mounted rudder controlled by a wheel and a shoal-draft keel. It displaces  and carries  of ballast.

The boat is fitted with a Japanese Yanmar  diesel engine.

Sleeping accommodation is provided for five people and consists of a bow "V" berth, a main cabin settee berth and a double-sized quarter berth. The head is fully enclosed and located to port aft of the forward cabin. The galley is aft, on the starboard side and includes an icebox and a two-burner alcohol or gas-fired stove mounted on gimbals. Ventilation is provided by six opening ports. The main cabin has  of standing headroom. All woodwork is teak, including the cabin accents, bulkheads and the cabinets, which are teak veneer over plywood. The cabin sole is a teak parquet design.

Operational history
The boat is supported by an active class club, the Watkins Owners.

By 2008 it was reported that four 27Ps were still in existence.

See also
List of sailing boat types

Related development
Watkins 27

Similar sailboats
Aloha 27
Cal 27
Cal 2-27
Cal 3-27
Catalina 27
C&C 27
Crown 28
CS 27
Edel 820
Express 27
Fantasia 27
Halman Horizon
Hotfoot 27
Hullmaster 27
Hunter 27
Hunter 27-2
Irwin 27 
Island Packet 27
Mirage 27 (Perry)
Mirage 27 (Schmidt)
Mirage 275
O'Day 272
Orion 27-2

References

Keelboats
1980s sailboat type designs
Sailing yachts
Sailboat type designs by Walter Scott
Sailboat types built by Watkins Yachts